Antonio Maria Zanetti (the younger), also Anton Maria Zanetti, (1706–1778) was a Venetian art historian, noted for his knowledge of antiquities, numismatics, statues, cameos, and sculpted gems. He was skilled in architecture and perspective and was an expert in music. As custodian of the Marciana Library (1737–1778), he compiled the first modern catalogues of the manuscript collection with detailed bibliographical information.

Life
Antonio Maria was born in the parish of San Giacomo dell'Orio in Venice on 1 January 1706. He was the elder of two sons. The family of his father, Alessandro Zanetti, belonged to the citizen class, whereas the family of his mother, Antonia Limonti, originated in Milan. At an unknown later date, the family transferred to the parish of Santa Maria Mater Domini. As a youth, Antonio Maria studied with the Jesuits. He had a particular aptitude for the classics and over time, became proficient in Greek. He also learned to paint under the guidance of Nicolò Bambini. Most importantly, he became a protégé of his homonymous older cousin Antonio Maria Zanetti and developed into a distinguished scholar of the antiquities and an art connoisseur.

Beginning in the early 1720s, Zanetti collaborated with his elder cousin on the edition of a two-volume work illustrating the classical sculpture conserved in the Venetian public collections. For this work, Zanetti provided many of the drawings of the statues. The engraving plates were made primarily by Giovanni Antonio Faldoni along with Giuseppe Camerata, Giovanni Cattini, Carlo Orsolini, Marco Alvise Pitteri, and Giuseppe Patrini. Although the initial project called for the presentation of all of the classical statues in the public collections, the two volumes of Delle antiche statue greche e romane, che nell'antisala della Libreria di San Marco, e in altri luoghi pubblici di Venezia si trovano, published in 1740 and 1743, only present 100 pieces. These were primarily from the Public Statuary but also included five statues in the courtyard of the Doge's Palace, the four horses of St Mark's Basilica, and the lions of the Arsenal. During this time, Zanetti was also tasked by Lorenzo Tiepolo, the state librarian, with compiling a complete two-volume catalogue with detailed descriptions of the 224 statues belonging to the Public Statuary, located within the Marciana Library.

In 1736, Tiepolo also asked Zanetti, together with Antonio Bongiovanni, to catalogue the manuscripts in the library. Zanetti was subsequently nominated custodian of the library, in 1737, when the position became vacant. The catalogs of the Greek, Latin, and vernacular codices, published in 1740 and 1741, contain descriptions of 1356 codices. With respect to the previous 'catalogues', printed inventories, the new catalogues followed modern guidelines and constituted a considerable development in providing readers with bibliographical material.

Works
 Descrizione delle pubbliche pitture di Venezia (1733)
 Delle antiche statue greche e romane, che nell'antisala della Libreria di San Marco, e in altri luoghi pubblici di Venezia si trovano, vol I, (1740)
 Delle antiche statue greche e romane, che nell'antisala della Libreria di San Marco, e in altri luoghi pubblici di Venezia si trovano, vol II, (1743)
 Varie pitture a fresco de' principali maestri veneziani (1760)
 Della pittura veneziana e delle opere pubbliche de' veneziani maestri (1771)

References

Bibliography
 Borroni, Fabio, I Due Anton Maria Zanetti (Firenze: Sansoni Antiquariato, 1956)
 Boorsch, Suzanne, Venetian prints and books in the age of Tiepolo (New York: The Metropolitan Museum of Art, 1997)
 Zanetti, Antonio Maria, ed., Græca D. Marci Bibliotheca codicum manu scriptorum per titulos digesta (Venetiis: Casparis Ghirardi & Simonem Occhi, 1740)
 Zanetti, Antonio Maria, ed., Latina et italica D. Marci Bibliotheca codicum manu scriptorum per titulos digesta (Venetiis: Casparis Ghirardi & Simonem Occhi, 1741)
 Zanetti, Girolamo, 'Memoria', in Antonio Maria Zanetti, Varie pitture a fresco de' principali maestri veneziani (Venezia; s.n., 1760)
 Zorzi, Marino, La libreria di san Marco: libri, lettori, società nella Venezia dei dogi (Milano: Mondadori, 1987) 

1706 births
1778 deaths
18th-century Venetian people
Italian art historians
Italian engravers